Tanyethira duplicilinea is a moth of the family Pyralidae first described by George Hampson in 1893. It is found in Sri Lanka.

The caterpillar is known to feed on Mangifera indica.

References

Moths of Asia
Moths described in 1893
Pyralidae